The Chinese name 清水灣半島 should not be confused with Oscar by the Sea, a private housing estate in Tseung Kwan O.

Clear Water Bay Peninsula, is a peninsula in Sai Kung District, Hong Kong. The peninsula separates Junk Bay from Port Shelter.

Features
The Clearwater Bay Golf & Country Club and the Shaw Studio are located here. TVB's headquarters, TV City, were previously located here but have since moved to Tseung Kwan O Industrial Estate.

Education
 Clearwater Bay School - A P to 6 ESF (English Schools Foundation) School.
 Sam Yuk Middle School

Public beaches
 Clear Water Bay First Beach
 Clear Water Bay Second Beach
 Silverstrand Beach

Transportation
 Clear Water Bay Road
 Hang Hau Road
 Tai Au Mun Road
 Po Toi O Chuen Road

References 

 
Peninsulas of Hong Kong